Baangi is a Kainji language of Nigeria spoken by the Kambari people.

References

Kambari languages
Languages of Nigeria